Avista Corporation is an American energy company which generates and transmits electricity and distributes natural gas to residential, commercial, and industrial customers. Approximately 1,550 employees provide electricity, natural gas, and other energy services to 359,000 electric and 320,000 natural gas customers in three western states.

Avista Utilities is the regulated business unit of Avista Corp., an investor-owned utility headquartered in Spokane, Washington. Avista Corp.'s primary, non-utility subsidiary was Ecova, an energy and sustainability management company with over 700 expense management customers, representing more than 600,000 sites. In 2014, Ecova was sold to Cofely, a subsidiary of GDF Suez.

The company was founded  in 1889 as Washington Water Power Company. The board of directors approved a name change to Avista Corporation, effective January 1, 1999, and the company began trading under the Avista name on Monday, 

At that time, the company also bought naming rights for Spokane's minor league baseball park, Avista Stadium.

History

Washington Water Power was founded in 1889 helping the new city of Spokane Falls to have more power. Using the Spokane River, the idea was that the town could use hydroelectricity. Trustees of the Edison Electric Illuminating Company asked for people to back them up in their project from New York to build a power station on the river. The people in New York refused saying that water power had little to no value. Defying the people in New York, 10 stockholders stepped up to support the project themselves and formed Washington Water Power to build it.

In the 1890s through the 1930s, Washington Water Power bought up streetcar companies in the city of Spokane and had cornered the transportation market by 1900. Despite seeing a peak in 1910, ridership declined through the 1930s and Washington Water Power's final streetcar line closed in 1936. The company would never again seek to enter the public transportation market.

In 1892 Washington Water Power purchased a park called Twickenham Park on the banks of the Spokane River. The company renamed the attraction Natatorium Park and expanded it with a large swimming pool in 1895 and it became an all-purpose recreation site for the city. Washington Water Power eventually sold the park in 1929.

Washington Water Power expanded in Oregon and into California by acquiring the natural gas operations of CP National from Alltel in 1989. The California operations were sold to Southwest Gas in 2005.

In 2014, Avista acquired Alaska Electric Light & Power, the electric utility for Juneau in an all stock transaction worth $170 million.

Avista supports adoption of electric vehicles. In 2016, Avista proposed a two-year pilot program that would install 265 charging stations for electric cars in the eastern part of Washington state. The program was estimated to cost around $3.1 million. It would install fast electric vehicle charging stations in 120 homes, 100 workplaces, and 45 public areas.

In 2017, Ontario-based electrical utility Hydro One agreed to purchase Avista.

In December 2018, The Washington Utilities and Transportation Commission rejected the proposed takeover by Hydro-One, saying the Ontario government (its largest shareholder) led by recently elected premier Doug Ford, had interfered politically in Hydro One's business affairs, most glaringly ordering the removal of CEO Mayo Schmidt, who he dubbed "the Six Million Dollar Man" during the election and vowed to fire him if elected.

Lawsuits
On September 27, 2002, Avista was sued for issuing false and misleading statements concerning its business and financial condition, including failing to disclose that Avista was engaged in highly risky energy trading activities with Enron and Portland General Electric. On December 20, 2007, Avista agreed to a $9.5 million settlement.

Restatement
On February 20, 2002, the company had voluntarily adjusted the amount originally allocated to IPR&D and will restate its third quarter 1998 consolidated financial statements accordingly.

Other media
Matthew Modine's character Louden Swain (Vision Quest) can be seen running over the Monroe Street Bridge with “Washington Water Power” prominently displayed in the background on the historic Washington Water Power Post Street Electric Substation.

References

External links

 
 Avista Utilities.com
 Avista Corp.com
 Ecova.com
 History

Companies listed on the New York Stock Exchange
Energy companies of the United States
Natural gas companies of the United States
Energy companies established in 1899
Electric power companies of the United States
Companies based in Spokane, Washington
Hydroelectric power companies of the United States